The Rally for Democracy and Socialism (RDS) is a political party in Burkina Faso led by Salfo Théodore Ouédraogo.

History
The party was established on 20 June 2009. It received 0.8% of the vote in the 2012 parliamentary elections, winning a single seat in the National Assembly.

References

2009 establishments in Burkina Faso
Political parties established in 2009
Political parties in Burkina Faso
Socialist parties in Burkina Faso